The Counter-Revolution of Science: Studies on the Abuse of Reason is a 1952 book by Nobel laureate economist Friedrich Hayek, in which the author asserts to address the problem of scientism in the social sciences, asserting that researchers and reporters attempt to apply the methods and claims of objective certainty from hard science.

Synopsis 

This book is divided into three parts. The first is a reworking of Hayek's essay, "Scientism and the Study of Society". The second is an analysis of the doctrine of Saint-Simon. Hayek lifts the title of the compiled book, The Counter-Revolution of Science, from Saint-Simon, who essentially asserted that the relative freedom of expression and thought of the Revolution in France was no longer necessary, that using the force of law to impose "scientific" conclusions on everyone was now necessary. The last segment examines Comte and Hegel, and their similar takes on the philosophy of history. The first two sections were both originally published in the peer-reviewed magazine Economica, in the early 1940s.

Hayek observes that the hard sciences attempt to remove the "human factor" in order to obtain objective, strictly controlled results:

Meanwhile, the soft sciences are attempting to measure human action itself:

He notes that these are mutually exclusive: Social sciences should not attempt to impose positivist methodology, nor to claim objective or definite results:

Publishing history 

Parts of this book were published in Economica Magazine in the early 1940s. The book itself was compiled and printed in 1952. It eventually fell out of print, but was re-published in the US in 1980, and remained available since.

Reception
Czech Neo-Marxist Karel Kosík in his book Dialectics of the Concrete (1976) criticizes the following passage of the book: "The object of scientific inquiry is never the totality of all observable phenomena in a given time and space, but always only certain aspects of it ... The human spirit can never encompass the 'whole' in the sense of all different aspects of the real situation". Kosík believes Hayek wrote it in a polemic against Marxist concept of totality, and clarifies that, "Totality indeed does not signify all facts. Totality signifies reality as structured dialectical whole, within which any particular fact (or any group or set of facts) can be rationally comprehended" as "the cognition of a fact or of a set of facts is the cognition of their place in the totality of reality." He considers Hayek's theory to be part of the atomist–rationalist philosophical thinking of reality, declaring "Opinions as to whether cognition of all facts is knowable or not are based on the rationalist–empiricist idea that cognition proceeds by the analytic–summative method. This idea is in turn based on the atomist idea of reality as a sum of things, processes and facts". Kosík claims that Hayek and those philosophers (including Karl Popper on The Poverty of Historicism and Ferdinand Gonseth of Dialectica) lack the understanding of the dialectical process of forming the totality.

American philosopher Susan Haack references Hayek's book several times in her 2009 essay "Six Signs of Scientism".

References

Notes

Books

External links 

 Full text in PDF and plain text formats.

1952 non-fiction books
American non-fiction books
Books by Friedrich Hayek
Classical liberalism
Criticisms of economics
English-language books